Adolphe Emmanuel Rouleau (6 September 1867 – 25 July 1937) was a French fencer. He competed in the individual foil masters event at the 1900 Summer Olympics, finishing 8th.

References

External links
 

1867 births
1937 deaths
Sportspeople from Lille
French male foil fencers
Olympic fencers of France
Fencers at the 1900 Summer Olympics